The International Federation of Tobacco Workers (IFTW) was a global union federation bringing together unions representing workers involved in growing, processing or selling tobacco.

History
The idea of an international federation of tobacco workers arose in the 1880s in the Belgian and Dutch unions, which tried to interest the German Tobacco Workers' Union in participating.  In 1889, a conference was held in Antwerp between the unions, and in 1890, the federation was launched.  It was based in Antwerp until 1910, then in Bremen, but became moribund during World War I.  It was refounded in 1918, and the headquarters were moved to Amsterdam.  By 1925, the federation had 25 affiliates, with a total of 118,000 members.  This then fell, and by 1935, it had only 42,000 members, in Belgium, Czechoslovakia, Denmark, France, the Netherlands, Norway, Sweden, Switzerland, and the UK.

In 1958, the federation merged into the International Union of Food and Drinks Workers' Associations, which renamed itself as the "International Union of Food, Drinks and Tobacco Workers' Associations", although some of its affiliates preferred instead to join the new Plantation Workers International Federation.

Affiliates
In 1954, the following unions were affiliated to the federation:

Leadership

General Secretaries
1890: J. Vendelmans
1892: H. Jughers
1910: Karl Deichmann
1919: Harry Eichelsheim
1931: Ferdinand Husung
1933: Edmund Olsen
1938: Dirk Nak
1952: Alfons van Uytven

Presidents
1919: Christian Jensen
1934: V. Novack
1945: Marcelle Delabit

References

Trade unions established in 1890
Trade unions disestablished in 1958
Global union federations
Tobacco industry trade unions